Aleksandar Mandić may refer to:

Aleksandar Mandić (director), Serbian director
Aleksandar Mandić (writer), Serbian writer
Aleksandar Mandić (politician), Serbian politician in the province of Vojvodina